Taprobane Island, originally called "Galduwa" ("Rock Island" in Sinhalese), is a private island with one villa, located just off the southern coast of Sri Lanka opposite the village of Weligama. The island was renamed after the old Greek word for Sri Lanka, by its most famous owner, Maurice Talvande (who styled himself as "Count de Mauny Talvande"), who sighted it around 1925 after a long search for an earthly paradise. He built its villa and replanted the island to create a private Eden. The islet passed on to the American author and composer Paul Bowles and then the Sri Lankan born former United Nations Chief Prosecutor Sir Desmond Lorenz de Silva before it came to the ownership of the Australian businessman Geoffrey Dobbs. 

Notable people who stayed on Taprobane include Dutch author Peter ten Hoopen, who spent a month there in 1984 during civil unrest on the mainland, as well as Kylie Minogue, who composed a song about the island inspired by her stay titled "Taprobane (Extraordinary Day)". It inspired Jason Kouchak to compose "Dark Island" in his 1999 album Watercolours.

The author Robin Maugham, who visited the island as a young man, and in the mid-1970s, considered the unique beauty and harmony of the villa had become compromised after de Mauny's death by partitioning and the loss of his furniture and fittings, and that the area itself had been despoiled by the construction of a new road along the mainland beach. Since then, and particularly after the 2004 tsunami, substantial further residential development on the adjoining mainland has occurred. While Arthur C. Clarke's novel The Fountains of Paradise takes place in "Taprobane", the setting is recognizably Sri Lanka, not this island.

Literature

References

External links 

Taprobane Island
"How to Live on a Part-time Island" by Paul Bowles

Hotels in Matara District
Islands of Sri Lanka
Landforms of Matara District
Private islands of Asia